Henry Charles Howard may refer to:
Henry Charles Howard, 13th Duke of Norfolk (1791-1856)
Henry Charles Howard, 18th Earl of Suffolk (1833-1898)
Henry Charles Howard (MP for Penrith) (1850-1914)

See also
Henry Howard (disambiguation)